Liabuku is an Austronesian language of Buton Island, off the southeast coast of Sulawesi in Indonesia. Considered a dialect of Muna, it is more divergent than other Muna dialects.

References

Muna–Buton languages
Languages of Sulawesi